The Constitution River, commonly called "The Careenage", is a river located along Carlisle Bay, on the south-western portion of Barbados.  The western end of the river runs through the centre of Bridgetown in Saint Michael.  The river acts as a channel for heavy rain run-off from the higher interior regions of the island.  Additionally, it is a small sheltered shallow passage or yacht harbour for medium-sized yachts or small craft boats to dock in the city.  It is located roughly 1 km south of the man-made Deep Water Harbour on the Princess Alice Highway.

River crossings

See also 
List of rivers of Barbados

References

External links 

Bridgetown, Barbados, Island Guide Barbados
Constitution River, TripAdvisor.com reviews

Bridgetown
Rivers of Barbados